Mr. Do's Wild Ride is a platform game released in 1984 as the third in Universal's Mr. Do! arcade video game series. An MSX version was published in 1985.

Gameplay 

Mr. Do!'s scenario is a roller coaster, and the object is to reach the top. As the cars (and eventually other objects) speed around the track, the player must escape by using a super speed button, or by climbing up small ladders scattered about the track to dodge the hazards. Two icons at the end of the level range from cakes to EXTRA letters or diamonds change upon collecting cherries at the top of each letter. The game is timed, and the timer ticks faster when the super speed button is held down. Collision with a roller coaster car or another object is fatal, knocking Mr. Do! off the coaster and costing a life.

After the sixth level is completed, the game cycles back to the first with various obstacles and/or more roller coaster cars to avoid.

Reception
In Japan, Game Machine listed Mr. Do's Wild Ride on their April 15, 1984 issue as being the sixth most-successful table arcade unit of the month.

Legacy 
Ocean Software published a clone for the Commodore 64, Amstrad CPC, and ZX Spectrum as Kong Strikes Back! It incorporates cosmetic aspects of Donkey Kong.

References

External links 

Mr. Do's Wild Ride at Arcade History

1984 video games
Arcade video games
Mr. Do!
MSX games
Multiplayer and single-player video games
Multiplayer hotseat games
Platform games
Universal Entertainment games
Video games about clowns
Video games developed in Japan